The Amazing Race 11 (also known as The Amazing Race: All-Stars) is the eleventh season of the American reality television show The Amazing Race. It featured eleven teams of two, ten returning teams from previous editions, and a dating couple who had met and competed against each other on a previous season, in a race around the world.

The season premiered on CBS on February 18, 2007, and the season finale aired on May 6, 2007.

Dating couple Eric Sanchez and Danielle Turner, who had competed on opposing teams on The Amazing Race 9, were the winners of this season, while beauty queens Dustin Seltzer and Kandice Pelletier finished in second place, and cousins Charla Faddoul and Mirna Hindoyan finished in third.

Production

Development and filming

As early as 2004, there had been talk about an all-star edition of The Amazing Race, with speculation that it would occur during the eighth season, just as it had with Survivor. These rumors were fueled by reports that season 4 winner Reichen Lehmkuhl had been invited to appear in a future all-star race. Speculation continued for the next few years, particularly after CBS aired all-star editions of their two other reality competition series, Survivor and Big Brother. On September 28, 2006, CBS ordered an 11th season of The Amazing Race. in November 2006, the network officially acknowledged that an all-star edition was in production. Host Phil Keoghan was originally skeptical that an all-star edition was feasible. Over time, Keoghan felt that "as we got more and more really good teams, it just seemed like it had to happen."

The new locales visited in this season were Ecuador, Mozambique, Poland, Macau, and Guam. This was the last season to feature the Yield until The Amazing Race 32.

Marketing 
This season introduced the Elimination Station, featured on the official website. A series of thirteen web episodes presented the eliminated contestants living together in a common house in their sequester location in Acapulco, Mexico. The series was viewable only in the United States and was available on the Innertube video streaming service on the CBS website, with a new episode debuting immediately following the airing of each new Amazing Race episode in the Pacific Time Zone.

Cast 

The eleven teams were selected from among the first ten seasons. Phil Keoghan personally submitted a list of fifteen teams that he thought should return. Ten of them were chosen. The team he didn't choose was Eric & Danielle, who did not previously race together. Keoghan said, "I didn't think of that new combination, which actually is a really good one." He also added that the production team's goal for the race "wasn't to pick the best racers," but "to pick the teams that have earned the most attention over the last 10 seasons". Only one team, Uchenna & Joyce, had won their original season, while other seasons' winners criticized CBS' casting process after being omitted, most notably Chip and Kim McAllister (season 5), and B.J. Averell and Tyler MacNiven (season 9).

Colin Guinn and Christie Woods from season 5 were invited to participate, but declined due to Christie's pregnancy. They would eventually participate on The Amazing Race 31. Flo Pesenti and Drew Riker, who began dating after meeting during season 3, were invited to participate, but Flo reportedly declined because she felt the first race had brought out the worst in her, and her season 3 winning partner, Zach Behr, was not invited to join her. 

Rob and Amber Mariano (née Brkich) had gotten married after competing on season 7.

Future appearances
Rob Mariano went on to compete on Survivor: Heroes vs. Villains, Survivor: Redemption Island, and participated as a non-competing mentor on Survivor: Island of the Idols. Rob and Amber both returned to Survivor to compete on Survivor: Winners at War. On May 23, 2016, Rob appeared on a Survivor-themed primetime special episode of The Price is Right.

Results
The following teams are listed with their placements in each leg. Placements are listed in finishing order. 
A  placement with a dagger indicates that the team was eliminated. 
An  placement with a double-dagger indicates that the team was the last to arrive at a pit stop in a non-elimination leg, and was "marked for elimination" in the following leg.
A  indicates that the team won the Fast Forward. 
A  indicates that the team used the Yield and a  indicates the team on the receiving end of the Yield. 
A  indicates that the teams encountered an Intersection.

Notes

Race summary

Leg 1 (United States → Ecuador)

Episode 1: "I Told You Less Martinis and More Cardio" (February 18, 2007)
Prize: A trip to Whistler, British Columbia (awarded to Rob & Amber)
Eliminated: John Vito & Jill
Locations
Palmetto Bay, Florida (Charles Deering Estate) (Starting Line)
 Miami → Quito, Ecuador
Quito (Plaza de San Francisco)
Quito (Pim's Restaurant)
Cotopaxi National Park (Hacienda Yanahurco) 
Cotopaxi National Park (Mirador Cotopaxi) 
Episode summary
Teams set off from the Charles Deering Estate in Palmetto Bay, Florida, and had to drive to Miami International Airport and book one of two flights to Quito, Ecuador. Six teams flew on the Copa Airlines flight, which departed first but arrived two hours after the American Airlines flight, which departed second and carried the other five teams.
Once in Quito, teams had to travel to Plaza de San Francisco in order to find their next clue, which sent them to Pim's Restaurant. There, teams had to pick one of three departure times the next morning, when teams were provided a map and had to drive themselves to Hacienda Yanahurco at Cotopaxi National Park, where they found their next clue.
 This season's first Detour was a choice between Wrangle It or Recover It. In Wrangle It, teams had to help local cowboys lasso, tie down, and groom one wild horse. Team members had to clip its hooves and trim its mane and tail. When the horse was released, teams received their next clue. In Recover It, one team member had to put on a historical military uniform and then search a field for three items missing from the uniform (an epaulette, a button, and a sword) in order to receive their next clue.
Teams had to check in at the pit stop: Mirador Cotopaxi in Cotopaxi National Park.

Leg 2 (Ecuador → Chile)

Episode 2: "Beauty Is Sometimes Skin Deep" (February 25, 2007)
Prize: An off-road motorcycle for each member (awarded to Rob & Amber)
Eliminated: Kevin & Drew
Locations
Cotopaxi National Park (Mirador Cotopaxi) 
 Quito → Santiago, Chile
Santiago (Codelco Corporate Headquarters) 
 Santiago → Calama
Calama (Chuquicamata) 
San Pedro de Atacama (Valley of the Dead) 
Episode summary
At the beginning of this leg, teams were instructed to fly to Santiago, Chile. Once in Santiago, teams had to make their way to the Codelco corporate headquarters in order to find their next clue.
 In this season's first Roadblock, one team member had to enter the Codelco headquarters and search the boardroom for letters of the alphabet. They had to figure out that the letters, when unscrambled, spelled one of the ten destinations inscribed on the plaques hanging on the wall. When they believed they had the solution – Chuquicamata – they had to show their answer to the security guard. If they were correct, he handed them their next clue.
Teams were then instructed to fly to Calama and then make their way to the Chuquicamata copper mine.
 This leg's Detour was a choice between By Hand or By Machine. In By Hand, teams had to choose a two-ton tire and finish securing it to a dump truck by screwing in properly-aligned bolts and washers in order to receive their next clue. In By Machine, each team member had to take turns driving a front loader to transfer enough gravel to cover a yellow line, at which point they received their next clue.
After the Detour, teams had to drive to the pit stop at the Valley of the Dead in San Pedro de Atacama.

Leg 3 (Chile)

Episode 3: "I'm Sorry I'm Wearing a Bathing Suit. It Is Very Weird, I Know" (March 4, 2007)
Prize: A home gym for each member (awarded to Rob & Amber)
Eliminated: David & Mary
Locations
San Pedro de Atacama (Valley of the Dead) 
San Pedro de Atacama (Iglesia de San Pedro de Atacama)
 Calama → Puerto Montt
Metri (Universidad de Los Lagos – Centro Acuicultura y Ciencias del Mar) 
Vicente Pérez Rosales National Park (Petrohué River – La Maquina) 
Vicente Pérez Rosales National Park (Playa Petrohué) 
Episode summary
At the beginning of this leg, teams had to travel to the Iglesia de San Pedro de Atacama in order to find their next clue, which instructed them to fly to Puerto Montt. Once there, teams had to drive to the Centro Acuicultura y Ciencias del Mar at the Universidad de Los Lagos in order to find their next clue.
 In this leg's Roadblock, one team member had to choose an  fish-breeding tank, jump in, and catch and transfer all 80 flounder to a holding tank at the other end of the farm. Once finished, their clue was revealed at the bottom of the tank.
After completing the Roadblock, teams had to travel to Vicente Pérez Rosales National Park, where they found their next clue along the Petrohué River.
 This leg's Detour was a choice between Vertical Limit or River Wild. In Vertical Limit, teams had to walk  to a cliff, where both team members had to complete a  rock climb. Each team member could grab half of their clue at the top. In River Wild, teams had to backtrack  to the banks of the Petrohué River, where they had to complete a  whitewater-rafting course through levels 3 and 4 rapids. After completing the course, teams received their next clue.
Teams had to check in at the pit stop: the nearby Playa Petrohué.

Leg 4 (Chile → Argentina)

Episode 4: "No Babies on The Race!" (March 11, 2007)
Prize: A trip to Maui (awarded to Oswald & Danny)
Eliminated: Rob & Amber
Locations
Vicente Pérez Rosales National Park (Playa Petrohué) 
 Puerto Montt → Punta Arenas
Punta Arenas (Lord Lonsdale Shipwreck)
Punta Arenas (Plaza Muñoz Gamero  & Nautilus  Mirador Cerro de la Cruz) 
 Punta Arenas → Ushuaia, Argentina
Ushuaia (Playa Larga)
 Ushuaia (Bahia Lapataia) → Isla Redonda  (Unidad Postal Fin del Mundo Post Office) 
Isla Redonda (Mástil de Crucero ARA General Belgrano) 
Episode summary
At the beginning of this leg, teams were instructed to fly to Punta Arenas. Once there, teams had to find the Lord Lonsdale shipwreck and locate the clue nearby.
 This leg's Detour was a choice between Navigate It or Sign It. In Navigate It, teams had to use a map of Punta Arenas in order to find the Plaza Muñoz Gamero, where a sailor gave them a compass. Using the compass, teams had to walk directly south to the Nautilus, a deep-sea salvage business, where the proprietor gave them their next clue. In Sign It, teams had to choose a pole and building supplies and carry them up a flight of stairs to Ferdinand Magellan's map. Using the map as a reference, teams had to determine that Magellan's circumnavigation of the world began and ended in Seville, Spain. They then had to build a traditional local signpost listing in order the fourteen ports-of-call of his voyage. While the signs didn't have to point in the right direction, all of the cities had to be spelled correctly. When they completed the signpost, they received their next clue.
After completing the Detour, teams had to make their way to the airport and sign up for one of two charter flights departing the next morning to Ushuaia, Argentina, one of the southernmost cities in the world. Once in Ushuaia, teams had to make their way to Playa Larga, where they found their next clue. Teams had to make their way to Bahia Lapataia in the Tierra del Fuego National Park, where they took a number for a spot on boats to Isla Redonda.
 In this leg's Roadblock, one team member had to search through 1,600 pieces of mail to find one of two letters addressed to their team, which were written by teams from their previous season. They then had to read the letter aloud to their partner, at which point they received their next clue.
Teams had to check in at the pit stop: the mast of the ARA General Belgrano on Isla Redonda.

Leg 5 (Argentina → Mozambique)

Episode 5: "You Need to Watch Your Jokes, Guy" (March 18, 2007)
Prize: A trip to Aruba (awarded to Charla & Mirna)
Locations
Isla Redonda (Mástil de Crucero ARA General Belgrano) 
Ushuaia (Martial Glacier)
 Ushuaia → Maputo, Mozambique
Bilene (Apopo Training Field) 
Maputo (Praça dos Trabalhadores )
Maputo (Maputo Central Market  Mercado Janet) 
Maputo (Fortaleza de Maputo ) 
Episode summary
At the beginning of this leg, teams had to ride a chair lift, pick up equipment, and hike  to the Martial Glacier, where they had to use an avalanche beacon to search for another beacon buried in the snow along with their next clue. Teams were then instructed to fly to Maputo, Mozambique. Once in Maputo, teams had to make their way to the Apopo Training Field in Bilene in order to find their next clue.
 In this leg's Roadblock, one team member had to guide a rat to find an Amazing Race flag above a deactivated landmine. Once their rat gave the signal that it had found something, a mine technician searched the area, and if they dug up the flag, the team could receive their next clue.
After completing the Roadblock, teams had to travel to the Praça dos Trabalhadores in order to find their next clue.
 This leg's Detour was a choice between Pamper or Porter. In Pamper, teams had to travel  to the Maputo Central Market, choose a nail-polish kit, and convince people to pay them to paint their nails until they earned at least 30MT (roughly $1) in order to receive their next clue. In Porter, teams made their way  to Mercado Janet, where they used their bare hands to fill ten  bags with coal and then sew them shut. Teams then had to carry one of the bags to a specified address, where the owner handed them their next clue.
Teams had to check in at the pit stop: the Fortaleza de Maputo.
Additional notes
Teams were provided tickets for a flight to Maputo, but were under no obligation to use them.
This was a non-elimination leg.

Leg 6 (Mozambique → Tanzania)

Episode 6: "We're Going to Trade You for Food Now" (March 25, 2007)
Prize: A catamaran for each team member (awarded to Charla & Mirna)
Eliminated: Teri & Ian
Locations
Maputo (Fortaleza de Maputo ) 
 Maputo → Dar es Salaam, Tanzania
 Dar es Salaam → Zanzibar City
Zanzibar City (Kiosk)
Zanzibar City (Stone Town – Beyt al Chai Hotel  Kijangwani – Kijangwani Lumber Yard) 
Kikungwi (Maasai Village) 
Zanzibar City (Stone Town – Old Fort of Zanzibar) 
Episode summary
At the beginning of this leg, teams were instructed to fly to Dar es Salaam, Tanzania. At the ferry terminal in Dar es Salaam, teams had to take a number for one of four dhows that took them to Zanzibar, where they searched for a nearby kiosk that had their next clue.
 This leg's Detour was a choice between Solve It or Schlep It. In Solve It, teams had to travel  to the Beyt al Chai hotel in Stone Town, where they had to assemble a 62-piece puzzle of an image from the tinga tinga style of local artwork in order to receive their next clue. In Schlep It, teams had to travel  to the Kijangwani Lumber Yard.
After completing the Detour, teams had to travel to the Maasai Village in Kikungwi in order to find their next clue.
 In this leg's Roadblock, one team member had to throw a traditional Maasai wooden weapon called a rungu  at a clay target hard enough to shatter it in order to reveal the clue hidden inside.
Teams had to check in at the pit stop: the Old Fort of Zanzibar in Zanzibar City.

Leg 7 (Tanzania → Poland)

Episode 7: "If I Were in Town, I'd Ask for Your Number - Part 1" (April 1, 2007)
Prize: A trip to Puerto Rico (awarded to Dustin & Kandice)
Locations
Zanzibar City (Stone Town – Old Fort of Zanzibar) 
 Zanzibar City → Warsaw, Poland
Warsaw (Czapski Palace)
Warsaw (Prymas Palace  Escada Boutique and Panoramik Laboratory) 
Warsaw (Łazienki Park – Statue of Jan III Sobieski)
Warsaw (Łazienki Palace) 
Episode summary
At the beginning of this leg, teams were instructed to fly to Warsaw, Poland. Once in Warsaw, teams had to travel to the Czapski Palace, where a Frédéric Chopin impersonator gave them their next clue.
 This leg's Detour was a choice between Perfect Pitch or Perfect Angle. In Perfect Pitch, which honored Frédéric Chopin, teams had to travel  to the Prymas Palace and choose a grand piano. They then had to use the provided tools to tune the one key of the piano that they determined was out of tune. Once a concert pianist played a piece of Chopin's music and determined that their piano was in tune, they handed teams their next clue. Once there, teams had to use an x-ray machine to locate a clue embedded inside the mannequin, which had to be positioned at a very specific angle in order for the image to show the name of their next destination.
After completing either Detour, teams either received a worksheet or x-ray film, from which they had to determine that their next location was the statue of Jan III Sobieski at Łazienki Park, where they found their next clue.
Teams had to check in at the pit stop: Łazienki Palace in Warsaw.
Additional notes
Due to limited availability of flights from Zanzibar to Warsaw, teams were provided tickets for a flight, but they were under no obligation to use them.
This was a non-elimination leg.

Leg 8 (Poland)

Episode 8: "If I Were in Town, I'd Ask for Your Number - Part 2" (April 1, 2007)
Prize: A trip to Saint Lucia (awarded to Uchenna & Joyce)
Eliminated: Joe & Bill
Locations
Warsaw (Łazienki Palace) 
 Warsaw (Monument to the Polish Underground State and Home Army) → Oświęcim (Auschwitz-Birkenau)
Kraków (Juliusz Słowacki Theatre) 
Kraków (Main Market Square – Fire Guard Tower & Town Hall Tower) 
Kraków (Okrąglak   Old Jewish Quarter – J. Mazurek Bakery & Klezmer-Hois) 
Sułoszowa (Pieskowa Skała)  
Episode summary
At the beginning of this leg, teams had to make their way to the Monument to the Polish Underground State and Home Army and choose tickets for one of two charter buses to Auschwitz-Birkenau. At Auschwitz, teams had to light a memorial candle on the railroad tracks to honor all those who were killed during the Holocaust. Once they observed a memorial silence, they received their next clue, which directed teams to the Juliusz Słowacki Theatre in Kraków.
 At the theater, teams encountered an Intersection, where teams were required to work together in pairs to complete tasks until further notice. The teams were paired up thusly: Eric & Danielle and Joe & Bill, Dustin & Kandice and Charla & Mirna, and Oswald & Danny and Uchenna & Joyce.
 In this season's first Fast Forward, one pair of newly-joined teams had to climb the stairs of the fire guard tower of St. Mary's Basilica and the Town Hall Tower. They had to count the number of stairs, add those numbers together, and present the sum to a guard atop the fire guard tower. If they had the correct answer, both teams would win the Fast Forward award. Oswald & Danny and Uchenna & Joyce won the Fast Forward.
 This leg's Detour was a choice between Eat It Up or Roll It Out. In Eat It Up, the newly-joined teams had to travel  to an old market, where they had to use traditional methods to make a  length of Polish kiełbasa sausage. The teams were then served  of cooked kiełbasa, and each person had to eat  of sausage in order to receive their next clue. In Roll It Out, the teams had to travel  to the J. Mazurek bakery in the Old Jewish Quarter and properly roll out twenty bagels. When finished, they had to carry a delivery of fresh bagels  to Klezmer Hois, where they received their next clue. Once teams completed the Detour, they were no longer joined together.
After completing the Detour, teams had to drive themselves to Pieskowa Skała in Sułoszowa.
 In this leg's Roadblock, one team member had to don a full suit of medieval armor and then lead a horse a  through the forest to the castle gates. Once at the castle, they had to deliver the horse to the stable boy, enter the courtyard, and search for the nearby pit stop.
Additional notes
Two teams arrived in first place due to collaboration on the Fast Forward during the Intersection. There was only one prize offered, however; Oswald & Danny conceded the prize to Uchenna & Joyce.
Legs 7 and 8 aired back-to-back as a special two-hour episode.

Leg 9 (Poland → Malaysia)

Episode 9: "The Way You Look, Yeah" (April 8, 2007)
Prize: A retro-scooter for each team member (awarded to Dustin & Kandice)
Eliminated: Uchenna & Joyce
Locations
Sułoszowa (Pieskowa Skała) 
 Kraków → Kuala Lumpur, Malaysia
  Kuala Lumpur → Gombak (Batu Caves)
Kuala Lumpur (Kampung Baru – Kampung Baru Mosque) 
Kuala Lumpur (Dewan Lama  Chow Kit Bomba) 
Kuala Lumpur (Taman Sri Hartamas) 
Kuala Lumpur (Carcosa Seri Negara) 
Episode summary
At the beginning of this leg, teams were instructed to fly to Kuala Lumpur, Malaysia. Once there, teams had to travel by bus to Gombak and find the Batu Caves, where they had to climb the steps and search for their next clue. Teams then traveled to the Kampung Baru Mosque and search for a nearby footbridge, where they found their next clue.
 This leg's Detour was a choice between Artistic Expression or Cookie Confection. In Artistic Expression, teams had to travel on foot to Dewan Lama, where they had to use a traditional technique known as batik to exactly duplicate one of three patterns onto a  piece of cloth. Then they had to dye the cloth to the satisfaction of the artisan in order to receive their next clue. In Cookie Confection, teams had to travel on foot to Chow Kit Bomba and search through 600 boxes of traditional Malaysian festive cookies by biting into each cookie until they found one with a black licorice center, at which point, they received their next clue.
After completing the Detour, teams made their way to the neighborhood of Taman Sri Hartamas, where they had to search for a newspaper vendor with a delivery truck in order to find their next clue.
 In this leg's Roadblock, one team member had to choose a bicycle with an attached side cart and then scour the neighborhood looking for residents willing to give them their used newspapers to recycle.
Teams had to check in at the pit stop: the Carcosa Seri Negara in Kuala Lumpur.
Additional notes
 Dustin & Kandice chose to Yield Eric & Danielle.
Uchenna & Joyce missed a connecting flight in Frankfurt, Germany, and did not arrive in Kuala Lumpur until roughly eight hours after all of the other teams. Although they were not shown performing any tasks, Joyce confirmed in an interview that they performed all of the leg's tasks, including the cookie Detour and the newspaper recycling Roadblock.

Leg 10 (Malaysia → Hong Kong)

Episode 10: "We Are Trying to Make Love, Not War" (April 15, 2007)
Prize: A trip to Hong Kong during Chinese New Year (awarded to Oswald & Danny)
Locations
Kuala Lumpur (Carcosa Seri Negara) 
 Kuala Lumpur → Hong Kong
Hong Kong (Kowloon – Sun Wah Kiu Dry Cleaning & Laundry)
Hong Kong (Kowloon – Former Kai Tak Airport) 
Hong Kong (Kowloon – Former Cheung Sha Wan Police Quarters  Nga Tsin Wai Road) 
Hong Kong (Kennedy Town – Former Kennedy Town Police Headquarters) 
Hong Kong (Causeway Bay – Victoria Park)
Hong Kong (Wan Chai District – Hong Kong Jockey Club & Happy Valley Racecourse) 
Episode summary
At the beginning of this leg, teams were instructed to fly to Hong Kong. Once there, teams had to find Sun Wah Kiu Dry Cleaning & Laundry, where they received their next clue.
 In this season's second Fast Forward, one team had to travel  to a film set located at the former Kai Tak Airport, where a high-speed stunt was being filmed for an action movie. They had to get in a car with a stunt driver and endure a stunt course, which involved sharp turns and the car flipping over. Oswald & Danny won the Fast Forward.
 This leg's Detour was a choice between Kung Fu Fighting or Lost in Translation. In Kung Fu Fighting, teams had to travel  to the former Cheung Sha Wan Police Quarters. Once there, they had to climb an 11-story bamboo scaffold, while avoiding a mock battle between kung fu stuntmen, in order to reach the top and retrieve their next clue. In Lost in Translation, teams had to make their way  to Kowloon City and search among hundreds of similar-looking Chinese characters store signs on Nga Tsin Wai Road for the specific one – 滿玉時裝晚裝 – shown on their clue. When they found the matching store, the owner gave them their next clue.
After completing the Detour, teams had to make their way to the former Kennedy Town police headquarters in order to find their next clue.
 In this leg's Roadblock, one team member had to kick down doors in the old building of the former police headquarters and search for their next clue.
After completing the Roadblock, teams had to travel to Victoria Park. There, teams had to find a model boat and a Travelocity Roaming Gnome. They then had to balance the gnome on the boat and pull the boat from one end of a pond to the other in order to retrieve the gnome and their next clue from inside the boat. If the gnome fell into the water, they had to start over.
Teams had to check in at the pit stop: the Happy Valley Racecourse at the Hong Kong Jockey Club.
Additional notes
This was a non-elimination leg.

Leg 11 (Hong Kong → Macau)

Episode 11: "Good Doing Business With You" (April 22, 2007)
Prize: A Yamaha WaveRunner for each member (awarded to Dustin & Kandice)
Locations
Hong Kong (Admiralty – Conrad Hong Kong) 
 Hong Kong → Macau
Macau (Sé – Macau Tower)  
Macau (São Lázaro – Lou Lim Ioc Garden)
Macau (Nossa Senhora de Fátima – Edificio Fabril Veng Kin  Sé – Nam Van Lake) 
Macau (São Lázaro – Rua de Silva Mendes)
Macau (Nossa Senhora do Carmo – Trilho da Taipa Pequena 2000 Park) 
Episode summary
At the beginning of this leg, teams had to travel by ferry to Macau. Once there, teams had to find a man on a rickshaw outside the ferry terminal, who gave them their next clue. Teams then had to travel by taxi to the Macau Tower, where they found their next clue.
 In this leg's Roadblock, one team member had to walk around the outer rim of the Macau Tower observation deck and then perform what was, at the time, the world's tallest SkyJump by falling  to the ground in a controlled descent in order to receive their next clue.
After completing the Roadblock, teams had to travel to the Lou Lim Ioc Garden in order to find their next clue.
 This leg's Detour was a choice between Noodle or Dragon. In Noodle, teams had travel to the factory of Fábrica de Sopa de Fita Weng Kei, choose a noodle making station, and use traditional methods to flatten and cut dough into two acceptable bundles of Chinese noodles in order to receive their next clue. In Dragon, teams had to travel to a warehouse, obtain a dragon head and drum, and carry them  to the harbor at Nam Van Lake. There, they had to attach the dragon head to a matching dragon boat and deliver the drum to the boat's master in order to receive their next clue.
After completing the Detour, teams had to find the Rua de Silva Mendes, where they found their next clue directing them to the pit stop: Trilho da Taipa Pequena 2000 Park.
Additional notes
 Oswald & Danny chose to Yield Eric & Danielle.
This was a non-elimination leg.

Leg 12 (Macau → Hong Kong → Guam)

Episode 12: "Oh My God, the Teletubbies Go to War" (April 29, 2007)
Prize: An all-terrain vehicle for each member (awarded to Dustin & Kandice)
Eliminated: Oswald & Danny
Locations
Macau (Nossa Senhora do Carmo – Trilho da Taipa Pequena 2000 Park) 
 Macau → Hong Kong
 Hong Kong → Hagåtña, Guam
Yigo (Andersen Air Force Base) 
Santa Rita (Orote Peninsula – U.S. Naval Base Guam) 
Humåtak (Fort Soledad) 
Episode summary
At the beginning of this leg, teams were instructed to travel by ferry back to Hong Kong, and then fly to the island of Guam. Once in Guam, teams had to drive themselves to Andersen Air Force Base, where they chose a military escort to drive them to the air base's control tower. There, they had to climb to the top of the control tower in order to find their next clue.
 This leg's Detour was a choice between Care Package or Engine Care. In Care Package, teams traveled to a warehouse, chose a loading station, and filled  packages with various humanitarian aid items for a neighboring island. Teams then boarded a C-17 Globemaster and participated in an airdrop training exercise. When they landed, the load master gave teams their next clue. In Engine Care, teams had to clean an engine pod on a B-52 bomber and scour the associated flap section on the wing to the satisfaction of an Air Force maintenance officer in order to receive their next clue.
After completing the Detour, teams had to travel to the U.S. Naval Base on the Orote Peninsula, where a naval escort drove them to a specified location with their next clue.
 In this leg's Roadblock, one team member had to perform a search and rescue mission. Using a handheld GPS receiver, they had to navigate through the jungle to find one of four training officers, who provided coordinates directing them to the landing zone. Then they used a radio and smoke grenade to signal a rescue helicopter to pick them up. The helicopter brought them back to their partner, where they received their next clue.
Teams had to check in at the pit stop: Fort Soledad in Humåtak.

Leg 13 (Guam → United States)

Episode 13: "Low to the Ground, That's My Technique" (May 6, 2007)
Winners: Eric & Danielle
Second Place: Dustin & Kandice
Third Place: Charla & Mirna
Locations
Humåtak (Fort Soledad) 
 Hagåtña → Honolulu, Hawaii
 Honolulu → Lanai City
Lanai (Kaumalapau Harbor) 
Lanai (Shipwreck Beach)
 Lanai City → Honolulu
 Honolulu → Oakland, California
San Francisco (Grateful Dead House) (Unaired)
San Francisco (San Francisco Old Mint)
San Francisco (San Francisco Botanical Garden) 
Episode summary
At the beginning of this leg, teams were instructed to fly to Honolulu, Hawaii. Once in Honolulu, teams had to proceed to Kamaka Air Hangar, where they had to sign up for one of three helicopters departing ten minutes apart to the island of Lanai. Once they landed, they had to drive themselves to Kaumalapau Harbor, where they received their next clue from a kahuna.
 This season's final Detour was a choice between Under or Over. In Under, teams had to swim into an underwater cave and retrieve a clue anchored to the cave's floor. In Over, teams had to use a paddle board and paddle together to reach a buoy that had their next clue.
After completing the Detour, teams had to make their way to  Shipwreck Beach, where they had to trek  along the shore to find a clue, which instructed them to use a kayak to paddle to a buoy holding their next clue near a World War II shipwreck.
Teams were instructed to return to Honolulu by helicopter and then fly to San Francisco, California. Teams then had to travel to the San Francisco Old Mint, where one team member had to enter a vault and answer four questions relating to their opinion of other teams from this season. Their answers created a four-digit code which locked a safe containing their final clue. The other team member then had 10 minutes to guess their teammate's answers, entering a code to unlock the safe. If they guessed correctly, the safe opened and they could retrieve their final clue. If the 10 minutes expired without a correct guess, a guard handed them their final clue. Teams were directed them to the finish line at the San Francisco Botanical Garden.
{|class="wikitable unsortable" style="text-align:center"
|-
! scope="col" rowspan=2 | Questions
! scope="col" colspan=3 | Answers
|-
! Charla & Mirna
! Dustin & Kandice
! Eric & Danielle
|-
! scope="row" | Who is the least trustworthy?
|Rob & Amber
|Joe & Bill
|Oswald & Danny
|-
! scope="row" | Who has the best sense of humor?
|Kevin & Drew
|Uchenna & Joyce
|Charla & Mirna
|-
! scope="row" | Who is the most overrated?
|Rob & Amber
|Rob & Amber
|Rob & Amber
|-
! scope="row" | Who do you most want to stay in touch with?
|John Vito & Jill
|Uchenna & Joyce
|Uchenna & Joyce
|}
Additional notes
In Lanai, there was an unaired Roadblock where one team member had to perform a  cliff jump.
In an unaired segment, after arriving in California, teams had to travel to the Grateful Dead House in San Francisco.

Elimination Station 
The first five teams eliminated were sequestered at a villa in Acapulco, Mexico to await the finale. Subsequently, eliminated teams telephoned the villa to inform those teams at the villa of their elimination, but continued to run as decoys to throw off spoilers to the final outcome of the season. The sequestered teams met with the decoy teams in the final destination city to cheer on the final three teams as they crossed the Finish Line.

CBS posted short videos on its website after each episode aired in the Pacific time zone to show the eliminated teams interacting at the villa.
After Leg 1, John Vito & Jill were the first eliminated and sent to the villa. While there, they were guessing who would be eliminated next. They thought it would either be Charla & Mirna or Kevin & Drew.
After Leg 2, Kevin & Drew were the second team eliminated and sent to the villa. While there, Kevin, Drew, and John Vito were arguing over what a stoop was. Later, they guessed Charla & Mirna would be eliminated next.
After Leg 3, David & Mary were the third team eliminated and sent to the villa. David recounted over breakfast how he was misdirected by several Chilean locals. Later, Jill shows David & Mary the master suite they saved for the first married couple. Later, Drew guessed Teri & Ian might be eliminated next.
After Leg 4, Rob & Amber became the fourth team eliminated and sent to the villa. Rob and Amber were welcomed very nicely; John Vito and Jill said they were a strong team. Later, they guessed that the next elimination would be Eric & Danielle.
Leg 5 was a non-elimination leg. The four eliminated teams sat around waiting for another team, only to hear John Vito and Kevin figure out that it must be a non-elimination leg. They spent time on a beach overlook; back at the villa, Rob dragged Mary into the pool.
After Leg 6, Teri & Ian were the fifth team eliminated and sent to the villa. Drew put on a displeased face for the camera when they arrived. A disgruntled Ian revealed that he believed Oswald & Danny are ruthless racers with no character, saying that when he worked with them in Ushuaia to book flights, they deliberately booked him a different flight and did not confirm it. He said that the same thing happened when Eric & Danielle worked with Oswald and Danny. He also predicted that either Dustin & Kandice or Uchenna & Joyce would win.
Leg 7 was a non-elimination leg. John Vito and Jill pondered about this non-elimination round. Ian expressed how he and Teri bonded with Joe & Bill and Eric & Danielle as a result of their spending consecutive days together in airports. Amber did tattoos for entertainment.
After Leg 8, Joe & Bill were the sixth team eliminated. The eliminated teams got a call from them and were sad to hear that Joe & Bill were eliminated. Mary asked Joe & Bill who they think should win. Bill said that he would love to see Uchenna & Joyce or Charla & Mirna win. The guests talked about the call the next morning. In a confessional, Kevin & Drew said that since they were so close to the Finish Line, they would see Joe & Bill where the season finished.
After Leg 9, Uchenna & Joyce were the seventh team eliminated. They called the villa and told the eliminated teams about their flight problem that led to their elimination. The teams at the villa expressed disappointment at Uchenna & Joyce's elimination, and Amber tells them they would meet up at the Finish Line. Prior to the call, Drew questioned why Dustin & Kandice need to participate in The Amazing Race when they had already won beauty pageants. Amber took exception to this, having won Survivor: All-Stars prior to her original season of The Amazing Race.
Leg 10 was a non-elimination leg. The eliminated teams waited for another team, only to discover that the leg was non-elimination. Amber taught Mary how to swim, allowing her to overcome her long-held fear of swimming.
Leg 11 was a non-elimination leg. The eliminated teams waited for a phone call from the next eliminated team, but give up after several days. John Vito came up with the idea of throwing an awards party to commemorate the end of their stay at the villa. Each racer drew another racer's name and presented him or her with funny and sometimes touching gifts.
After Leg 12, Oswald & Danny were the eighth and final team eliminated. The five teams at the villa departed for the "end city" in order to cheer the remaining teams at the finish line. They reunited with Joe & Bill, Uchenna & Joyce, and newly eliminated Oswald & Danny. Oswald and Danny said they would like to see Charla & Mirna win the competition, while some of the other teams reiterated who they would like to see win.
Leg 13 was the final leg of The Amazing Race: All-Stars. Some of the eliminated teams shared their opinions on the winners and the runners-up. The final three admitted to their joys and disappointments.

Reception

Critical response
The Amazing Race 11 received mixed reviews. Linda Holmes of Television Without Pity was critical of this season's cast writing that "there weren't that many teams that didn't halfway suck to begin with, and we still had about a 75 percent chance of a better ending than this. We're all cursed." Simon Brew of Den of Geek wrote that "the procession of camera hoggers in this season ultimately, come the final round, left the audience with a real problem: there was nobody to root for." Roger Holland of PopMatters wrote that "TAR-11 started poorly, stuttered and staggered around the globe like the zombified remains of its former self, and finished on an absolute all-time low." Leslie Seaton of BuddyTV wrote that even though "the season definitely had some exciting moments, I still maintain that I'm not sure an All-Star season is a great idea for this show." Sarah Kickler Kelber of The Baltimore Sun wrote that "all in all, it was a fun season, even if it's not a result I would have predicted." Heather Havrilesky of Salon wrote "this season's challenges were some of the most frustrating and difficult ever". In 2016, this season was ranked 8th out of the first 27 seasons by the Rob Has a Podcast Amazing Race correspondents.

Ratings
Canadian ratings

References

External links
Official website

 11
2007 American television seasons
Television shows filmed in Florida
Television shows filmed in Ecuador
Television shows filmed in Peru
Television shows filmed in Chile
Television shows filmed in Argentina
Television shows filmed in Mozambique
Television shows filmed in South Africa
Television shows filmed in Tanzania
Television shows filmed in Germany
Television shows filmed in Poland
Television shows filmed in Malaysia
Television shows filmed in Hong Kong
Television shows filmed in Macau
Television shows filmed in Japan
Television shows filmed in Guam
Television shows filmed in Hawaii
Television shows filmed in California